David Daniels (born 12 March 1966) is an American countertenor.

Youth
Daniels was born in Spartanburg, South Carolina, the son of two singing teachers. He began to sing as a boy soprano, moving to tenor as his voice matured. His father, baritone Perry Daniels, was one of the pre-eminent members of the performing faculty during each summer at Brevard Music Center, linked to the School of Music at Converse College in Spartanburg; his mother was an operatic soprano. Daniels studied music at the Cincinnati College Conservatory of Music. Dissatisfied with his achievements as a tenor, Daniels switched to singing countertenor during graduate studies at the University of Michigan School of Music, Theatre & Dance (Master of Music in 1992) under the guidance of his teacher, George Shirley.

Career

Daniels made his professional singing debut in 1992. In 1997, he won the Richard Tucker Award. In 1999, he made his debut with the Metropolitan Opera, as Sesto in Handel's Giulio Cesare.

His repertoire has grown to include other major Handel roles, including Arsace in the comedy Partenope at the Lyric Opera of Chicago and San Francisco Opera in 2014; the title role in Tamerlano; and Arsamene in Xerxes. At the Bavarian State Opera in Munich, Daniels played the title roles in Rinaldo and Orlando, as well as David in Saul. He interpreted Ottone in Monteverdi's L'incoronazione di Poppea and recorded the role of Nero in the same work; it was also his debut role at San Francisco Opera in 1998. In Vivaldi's opera Bajazet, he sang the role of Tamerlano. In 2013, he sang the title role in Giulio Cesare at the Metropolitan Opera.

Daniels has also branched out from the baroque roles usually associated with countertenors to include Oberon in Benjamin Britten's A Midsummer Night's Dream at the Metropolitan Opera, and as Orfeo in Gluck's Orfeo ed Euridice at the Royal Opera House, Covent Garden. In July 2013 he created the role of Oscar Wilde in Oscar at the Santa Fe Opera, written for him by Theodore Morrison; he then sang Oscar again in Opera Philadelphia's production in 2015. The same year he made his debut at the Vienna State Opera as Trinculo in Thomas Adès' opera The Tempest.

From Fall 2015 to March 2020, Daniels joined the faculty of his alma mater, the University of Michigan School of Music, Theatre & Dance, as Professor of Music in Voice.

Sexual assault allegations 
In the Fall of 2018, Daniels was placed on leave with the University of Michigan School of Music, Theatre & Dance after allegations of sexual assault. Following the allegations, a second student accused Daniels of sexual assault, and brought civil lawsuits against both Daniels and the University of Michigan, in October 2018. In response to the second lawsuit, Daniels filed a counter-claim, saying that the charges were "fake and malicious". Shortly after Daniels' counterclaim, the lawsuit against Daniels was dismissed. However, the lawsuit against the University of Michigan remained in effect. Following this, the San Francisco Opera removed Daniels from its 2019 production of Orlando "after considerable deliberation given the serious allegations of sexual assault". In January 2019, Texas filed charges of second-degree sexual assault against Daniels and his husband, who were then arrested in Ann Arbor, Michigan. On 26 March 2020, at the recommendation of U-M President Mark Schlissel and in a unanimous vote by the Board of Regents, Daniels was dismissed from U-M effective immediately and without severance pay.

Art songs
In addition to his operatic work, Daniels also gives regular recitals, for which he has developed a repertoire that includes 19th- and 20th-century art songs not usually associated with countertenors, including works by such composers as Berlioz and Poulenc.

Personal life 
Daniels married conductor Scott Walters, at Dumbarton House in Washington, on 21 June 2014; the ceremony was conducted by United States Supreme Court Justice Ruth Bader Ginsburg.

References

External links 

 
 Interview with Daniels, James Jorden, parterre box, 23 June 1999
 , from Vivaldi's 1735 opera Bajazet (Il Tamerlano)

1966 births
Living people
20th-century American male opera singers
EMI Classics and Virgin Classics artists
American gay musicians
Operatic countertenors
Richard Tucker Award winners
University of Michigan School of Music, Theatre & Dance alumni
Singers from South Carolina
Musicians from Spartanburg, South Carolina
21st-century American male opera singers
University of Cincinnati – College-Conservatory of Music alumni
University of Michigan faculty
Gay singers
American LGBT singers
LGBT people from South Carolina
20th-century American LGBT people
21st-century American LGBT people